Love and Hate: The Story of Colin and JoAnn Thatcher is a Canadian television miniseries, directed by Bruce Pittman and broadcast by CBC Television in 1989. Based on Maggie Siggins's 1985 book A Canadian Tragedy: JoAnn and Colin Thatcher: A Story of Love and Hate, the film dramatizes the story of Colin Thatcher, a former Canadian politician who was convicted in 1984 of the murder of his ex-wife JoAnn following their divorce.

The two-part miniseries starred Kenneth Welsh as Colin Thatcher and Kate Nelligan as JoAnn Thatcher Wilson. Its cast also included Noam Zylberman, Leon Pownall, Brent Carver, Laura Bruneau, Cedric Smith, Victoria Snow, Stuart Hughes, John Colicos, Peter MacNeill, Gabrielle Rose, R. H. Thomson, Eugene Lipinski, Timothy Webber, Doris Petrie and Lenore Zann in supporting roles.

The series aired December 3 and 4, 1989 on CBC Television. It was also subsequently broadcast in July 1990 on NBC in the United States, under the title Love and Hate: A Marriage Made in Hell.

Thatcher, who was still protesting his innocence of the murder and attempting to pursue a retrial, criticized the film as inaccurate, and sued both Siggins and the CBC in 1994 on the grounds that the film could jeopardize his chances of retrial or parole. The lawsuit was not decided in Thatcher's favour.

Awards

References

External links

1989 television films
1980s Canadian television miniseries
CBC Television original films
English-language Canadian films
1989 in Canadian television
Films directed by Francis Mankiewicz
Canadian drama television films
1980s Canadian films